The XXXVI Corps was a German military formation in World War II.

It was formed in October 1939 and took part in the invasion of France. In August 1940 the corps was moved to southern Norway and from there to northern Finland.

It took part in Operation Barbarossa in mid-1941. It was part of the German AOK Norwegen (Army Norway) and was moved to northern Finland during June 1941. The XXXVI Corps took part in Operation Polarfuchs aiming to advance through Salla to Kandalaksha, and from there to Murmansk.

In November 1941 the corps was renamed the XXXVI Gebirgskorps (Mountain corps).

In late 1944 the corps had to fight its former allies during their withdrawal from Finland. The corps was forced to retreat from Finland back to Norway. The corps stayed the rest of the war in Norway and surrendered there in May 1945.

Commanders 
 General of the Cavalry Hans Feige (Mai 1940 - 30 November 1941)
 General of the Infantry Karl Weisenberger (1 December 1941 - 10 August 1944)
 General of Mountain troops Emil Vogel (10 August 1944 - 8 May 1945)

Area of operations

Organisation

Formations 
 71st Infantry Division (to August 1940)
 212th Infantry Division (to August 1940)
 SS Division Nord (from June 1941 to July 1941, transferred to Finnish III Corps)
 169th Infantry Division
 163rd Infantry Division (from 1942)
 Finnish 6th Division (from June 1941 to 1942)

Units 
 Panzer-Abteilung 211
 Panzer-Abteilung 40
 16. RajaJK (Finnish Border guard company)
 26. RajaJK (Finnish Border guard company)
 46. RajaJK (Finnish Border guard company)

References

Corps 36
M036
Military units and formations established in 1939
Military units and formations disestablished in 1945
1939 establishments in Germany